Batocnema africanus is a moth of the family Sphingidae. It is known from open woodland and savanna from north-eastern South Africa to Zimbabwe, Tanzania and the Kenya coast.

The length of the forewings is 30–33 mm for males and about 35 mm for females and the wingspan is 72–85 mm. The head and body are pale green and the tegulae and first abdominal tergite are dark green. The forewings are pale yellowish green shot with pink and mottled with darker green and yellow. There is a large dark green inner marginal spot at the base, a dark green wedge-shaped spot at the costa and a large quadrate dark green spot at the apex. The hindwings are yellow with a green border and a dark green spot at the tornus.

It is similar to Batocnema coquerelii, but the general pattern is paler and less contrasting.

The larvae feed on Sclerocarya caffra.

References

Ambulycini
Moths described in 1899
Moths of Africa